Shincheonji Church of Jesus, the Temple of the Tabernacle of the Testimony (SCJ), commonly known as Shincheonji Church of Jesus or simply Shincheonji, is a denomination of Christian new religious movement established in South Korea by Lee Man-hee. It is considered as a pseudoreligion or cult by mainstream churches.

Shincheonji's teaching claims that their founder Lee is the pastor promised in the New Testament, and that the Book of Revelation is written in secret metaphors (parables) which only Lee is capable of deciphering. Before founding his own religious movement, Lee was a member of a controversial group called the Olive Tree, a new religious movement which spawned the first countercult movement in post-war Korea, although this connection is not present in Shincheonji's biography of Lee.

Shincheonji teaches that it is the true faith with its members receiving salvation at the time of final judgment. Everyone not in the group will be denied forgiveness and destroyed.

In 2020, the group became the center of intense scrutiny during the COVID-19 pandemic in South Korea. The outbreak of COVID-19 cases in Korea was initially centered in the city of Daegu after a 61-year-old Shincheonji member known as Patient 31 infected other church members causing the pandemic to surge in Daegu. As the disease spread among Shincheonji's members and thousands of others, there was a national outcry against the group and by 22 February 2020, over 1.3 million South Korean citizens signed an online petition to the Blue House requesting the government to disband Shincheonji entirely.

Doctrine 
The group is apocalyptic and messianic in character, and has been described as a doomsday cult.

The group's founder and leader Lee is a self-proclaimed messiah. Church followers variously refer to him as "Chairman Lee(이 총회장)"; "the chairman(회장)"; "the promised pastor(약속의 목자)"; "the one who overcomes(이긴자)"; or "the advocate(대언자)." Adherents believe that Lee is the messenger sent by Jesus Christ, and believe him to be uniquely able to interpret the Book of Revelation. The group believes that in the times of the fulfillment of the New Testament prophecies, 144,000 adherents and a great multitude in white that no one can count, which comes out of the great tribulation, will enjoy salvation and eternal life as promised in the book of Revelation.

The group is known for its aggressive, and deceptive proselytizing practices. With a poor image in mainstream South Korean society, Shincheonji leaders have at times instructed their members to lie about being adherents of the group, although the group has said that doing so is not its official policy. The group is regarded as heretical by mainstream Christian denominations.

History

Lee Man-hee was born in 1931. In 1967, Lee became a member of the Tabernacle Temple which, under pressure from the "religious purification policy" of Chun Doo-hwan (coup in 1980), became affiliated with the Presbyterian Church. Lee left the Tabernacle Temple in 1971.

Some have connected Lee to a countercult movement called Olive Tree, but this connection is not present in Shincheonji's biography of Lee.

On March 14, 1984, Lee founded Shincheonji and opened its first temple that June in Anyang, Gyeonggi Province. Membership grew and in June 1990, the Zion Christian Mission Center was established in Seoul. In 1995, the membership within South Korea was divided into 12 "tribes", according to geographic territories. In 1999, the headquarters were moved to Gwacheon, which has a prophetic meaning within Shincheonji theology. Mainline Christian churches became alarmed at the loss of members, and the first cases of deprogramming Shincheonji members began in 2003.

Membership

In 2014, it was estimated to have over 120,000 members, while a 2020 estimate put membership at around 200,000. It was once the fastest-growing religious church in South Korea.

In March 2020, health authorities of the Government of South Korea investigating the COVID-19 pandemic officially declared to the press that they obtained an exact list of 317,320 registered Shincheonji members.

Opposition
In Singapore, 21 members were arrested for congregating together, and were charged with being a part of an "unlawful society". They face up to 3 years in jail if convicted.

In 2020, China banned Shincheonji church.

Threats towards Shincheonji
On 4 April 2020, a 39-year-old man threw a rock at the Ulsan branch church, breaking a glass window at the front entrance of the church building. His stated motivation was his thought that COVID-19 spread because of Shincheonji members. On 26 August 2020, he was found guilty of property damage, and was sentenced to 6 months in prison with 2 years’ suspension of sentence, and 80 hours of mandated volunteer work.

On 21 September 2020, a Shincheonji branch church in Daejeon, South Korea received an anonymous threat letter, containing white powder later identified by the Chemical Safety Agency and the Geumgang Basin Environment Agency to be cyanide, a USB containing a bitcoin address, and a message demanding 14.4 billion won. The anonymous message stated that harm will come upon Shincheonji congregants if the requested 14.4 billion won was not deposited. The case is still under investigation. Police investigation has ruled that the threatening letter was originally addressed to a different Shincheonji location in Gyeonggi-do.

Controversies

Political controversy
The group has been accused of exerting influence on politicians and political parties. A former member accused the Chairman Lee of Shincheonji of having created the former name of the Liberty Korea Party. Until 2017, the Liberty Korea Party was named "Saenuri Party". On 6 November 2020, the prosecutor's office ruled that there was no evidence to support this accusation and that there was no connection between Lee and the creation of the Saenuri Party.

Accusations against the church
The sect has been accused of actively infiltrating other churches to convert other churches' members.

 South Korea – Its members have been reportedly sighted in Myeongdong Cathedral, allegedly pretending to be pious believers seeking to lure other Koreans or foreigners into their own religious meetings.
 Colombia – Its members have been reportedly sighted in Basílica Menor Nuestra Señora de Lourdes, in Bogotá,  claiming to know the truth from biblical studies and the apocalypse prophecy.
 United Kingdom – In November 2016, the Church of England issued a formal alert to around 500 parishes in London about the activities of a Shincheonji affiliate known as Parachristo. Parachristo, a registered charity in the UK, runs Bible study courses in London Docklands, and was using these courses to recruit members of the Church of England. "Those who become involved [in Shincheonji] gradually withdraw from friends and family and actively lie about their real lives." Further warnings were issued by Nicky Gumbel, vicar of Holy Trinity Brompton, and John Peters, rector of St Mary's Church, London.
 New Zealand – In April 2017, several local Korean churches in Auckland including the New Zealand Korean Churches Association and the Immanuel Korean Church warned their congregations that the Shincheonji was seeking to recruit members through their Bible classes, encourage members to cut family ties, and sending "reapers" to infiltrate and take over other churches. In April 2019, several churches in Wellington including The Street Church and Blueprint Church raised concerns about the Shincheonji's methods in recruiting members from their congregations. The historian Peter Lineham also described the group's recruitment techniques as "dangerous" and "deceptive."
Australia – Members of the church have targeted public areas and universities frequented by international students in Sydney and Melbourne.
 India – In August 2019, the Baptist Convention in Manipur, India, warned worshippers to be wary of Shincheonji. "Their leader Lee Man-Hee claims to have access to secret knowledge of scriptures which other church pastors do not know. Moreover, he claims that one can truly know God only by following and listening to the teachings of Shincheonji. Once they are into this group, they spend most of their time inviting people to join Shincheonji group and spend less time with their families, friends and churches and neglect and quit their studies or work."
 Singapore - In late February 2020, Home Affairs Minister K. Shanmugam announced that the Ministry of Home Affairs would be investigating the local Shincheonji chapter for fraudulent activities including creating front companies and using deceptive methods to recruit young people into their sect.

Association with the coronavirus outbreak

The sect became involved in controversy during the COVID-19 pandemic, an outbreak of SARS-CoV-2 infections followed from the participation of a SARS-CoV-2 infected person, "Patient 31", at the organization. A dozen Chinese members of the church from Wuhan were also connected to the Daegu Shincheonji outbreak.

In Busan, a 61-year-old Daegu resident is believed to have spread the virus and was diagnosed on 18 February 2020. At the time, the South Korean government had neither introduced social distancing nor restricted travel from China (apart from travel from the Hubei province).

On 18 February 2020, Shincheonji issued a church-wide announcement of Patient 31's confirmation and closed down its churches and affiliated buildings.

On 20 February 2020, Shincheonji's Daegu branch submitted a list of its members to the Korea Centers for Disease Control and Prevention to aid with contract-tracing.

By 20 February 2020, 53 new cases were Shincheonji attendees or their families, reaching over 300 by 23 February, over half of all cases in South Korea in February. The subsequent resurgences of the virus in September 2020 and December 2020, however, surpassed the numbers seen during the outbreak associated with Shincheonji and have accelerated at a faster rate than the spread associated with Shincheonji's Daegu branch church.

Privacy concerns
On 24 February 2020, the Korea Disease Control and Prevention Agency requested a list of all Shincheonji congregants. The list included congregants’ name, citizen registration number, address, name of place of employment, and family member information. A day after, Shincheonji submitted the list of all congregants and complied with the government's request. 

There was no deadline listed in the official information request letter sent to Shincheonji for epidemiological investigation. The official request also did not ask for members’ citizen registration numbers. Despite this, officials from the Korea Disease Control and Prevention Agency requested members’ citizen registration numbers to be included in the data.

There was a day's delay in submitting information, however, as Shincheonji officials asked the Korea Disease Control and Prevention Agency about the legality of providing congregants’ citizen registration numbers and if the government will protect the congregants’ private information.

On 25 February 2020, Shincheonji officials provided the list of requested information for all of its congregants.

In the October 2020 trial of Chairman Lee Man-Hee, where he is accused of not complying with epidemiological investigations, an official from the Korea Ministry of Health and Welfare acknowledged that Shincheonji officials made effort to provide the requested congregants’ information. The conversation records between Shincheonji officials and the Agency official show an expression of concern over privacy, not a refusal to provide information or a refusal to cooperate.

Chairman Lee's counsel argued that the request for congregants’ citizen registration numbers had nothing to do with epidemiological investigation.

In the initial discussion between representatives of Shincheonji and the Blue House, the Blue House official in charge of the case was made aware of Shincheonji's concerns for congregants’ safety and privacy, and the omission of information from certain congregants, such as minors and those at special risk for persecution, such as elected politicians or public officials.

The police have determined that the intention for omitting certain congregants’ information was not for the purpose of obstructing disease prevention and control efforts, but to protect congregants of Shincheonji.

In a recorded phone conversation, Chairman Lee told the Shincheonji representative in charge of communicating with the government to provide congregant information that “since the government is doing what Shincheonji should’ve done instead, we must actively help [the government].”

Alex Azar, United States Secretary of Health and Human Services, described South Korea's approach to COVID-19 as something that "would likely not fly here in the United States" and referred to the South Korean government's authoritarian crackdown on Shincheonji as he described how South Korea "used their military and police powers to lock down that church, arrest everybody that was in contact with individuals in that church."

Legal battle

With an additional 4,000 cases of COVID-19 within two weeks, and roughly 60% of the total infections nationwide having stemmed from the church, the Seoul city government asked prosecutors to press charges against the religious group's founder and senior members for murder, causing harm, and for violating the Infectious Disease and Control Act. Interviews have occurred with all 230,000 members of the religious group and nearly 9,000 were said to be showing symptoms of the virus.

After a lawsuit was started by the Mayor of Seoul, on 25 February 2020, the Governor of Gyeonggi Province Lee Jae-myung, along with 40 officials, entered the Shincheonji headquarters office and seized about 50 computers after making a forcible entry into the headquarters. The authorities checked the list seized during the raid with the one Shincheonji had supplied, and concluded that discrepancies were minor. The Seoul City government filed legal complaints to state prosecutors against 12 leaders of the church, accusing the group of homicide, causing harm, and violating the Infectious Disease and Control Act.

After the outbreak amongst Shincheonji's Daegu branch church in February, 51 Shincheonji-related locations in Daegu have been closed. Out of this, 14 locations have been shut down since February of this year. Shincheonji has only held online services since February. However, its buildings continue to remain closed and Shincheonji has requested for the courts to reconsider the order for building closure. Shincheonji is requesting access to the buildings for the sake of building maintenance, not for usage of religious meetings or activities. The City of Daegu, however, has rejected the request, stating that building maintenance is currently not needed and that the public opinion against Shincheonji's Daegu Church still has not recovered. The courts have not yet ruled against or for the request. The situation could also be resolved upon an agreement between Shincheonji Daegu Church and the City of Daegu.

Criminal charges against group's leader
On 31 July 2020, Lee Man-Hee was arrested by South Korean authorities for allegedly hiding crucial information from contact-tracers and other offenses; by this time the Shincheonji Church was being linked to more than 5,200 coronavirus infections, or 36% of South Korea's total cases. Prosecutors specifically alleged that Lee had failed to provide health authorities with a complete lists of church members in violation of South Korea's Infectious Disease Control and Prevention Act. The Vice Minister of the Ministry of Health and Welfare (South Korea) has publicly stated that Shincheonji has cooperated with authorities.

Lee was initially detained pending trial, and several previous appeals for bail were initially rejected. However, on 12 November 2020, the court granted bail to Lee, with the court noting Lee's consistent attendance and compliance during court proceedings, as well as the health concerns of detaining a 90-year-old senior in prison.

Prosecutors sought a five-year prison sentence and a fine of 3 million Korean won (2,700 U.S. dollars) on the Infectious Disease Control and Prevention Act charges. In January 2021, the Suwon District Court acquitted Lee of the COVID-19-related charges, ruling that lists of church members were not "key elements of epidemiological surveys" defined in the Act. However, the court, found Lee guilty of embezzling 5.6 billion won (US$5.11 million) from the church to build a home, and of using government facilities to conduct religious services, and issued a four-year suspended sentence to Lee.

Shincheonji response

In a press conference in early March 2020, the church's founder Lee Man-Hee publicly kneeled and bowed his head to the ground in a traditional Korean gesture of apology, apologized for church members unintentionally spreading the virus, and said that the church was cooperating with the government.

In response to the negative media attention on Shincheonji, Lee Man-hee spoke publicly about being misunderstood or falsely accused. Shincheonji has been cited as the "most vilified group during pandemic".

On 26 August 2020, the Korea Centers for Disease Control and Prevention (KCDC) thanked Shincheonji for 562 of its congregation members donating plasma for COVID-19 treatment research, and requested collaboration with Shincheonji to hold a large-scale plasma donation drive from 26 August 2020 to 4 September 2020. An additional 1,100 Shincheonji members are estimated to donate plasma in collaboration with the KCDC.

On 16 September 2020, Shincheonji held an interfaith online prayer meeting titled “COVID-19 Overcome Online Prayer Meeting” to pray for the speedy end of COVID-19.

On 26 September 2020, Shincheonji's volunteer association began a ‘prevention volunteering’ campaign, with Shincheonji members volunteering to sanitize shopping districts and passing out hand sanitizers and masks to local businesses.

On 3 November 2020, the KCDC announced that starting from the 16th of November, there will be approximately 4,000 additional recovered COVID-19 patients from Shincheonji who will donate their plasma for the development of a treatment.

Over the course of 2 rounds of large-scale plasma donation drives with Shincheonji, a total of 2,798 members agreed to participate in the drive, and 2,030 successfully donated plasma. From the Daegu Church of Shincheonji, 1,700 congregation members donated plasma over the course of July and August of this year. The Director of the KCDC expressed his deep gratitude towards Shincheonji for actively participating in the plasma drive.

References

Further reading

External links 

 
 Chronology and history of Shincheonji Church of Jesus (World Religions and Spirituality website)

Christian new religious movements
Christianity in South Korea
Christian organizations established in 1984
Cults
1984 establishments in South Korea
Organizations associated with the COVID-19 pandemic
COVID-19 pandemic in South Korea